Felipe Cunha e Silva (born 31 March 1997) is a Portuguese tennis player who currently plays at the ITF Men's Circuit. In April 2016, he made his ATP World Tour debut in the doubles event of the 2016 Estoril Open. Cunha e Silva, who reached a doubles career high no. 371 in April 2017, is son of the former Portuguese tennis player João Cunha e Silva.

Career finals

ITF Men's Circuit

Doubles: 10 (7 titles, 3 runners-up)

Career earnings

* As of 10 April 2017.

References

External links

1997 births
Living people
Sportspeople from Cascais
Portuguese male tennis players